Pseudo-mythology ( or kabinetnaya mifologiya, "office mythology", literally "cabinet mythology") are myths and deities which do not exist in genuine mythology and folklore or their existence is doubtful or disproved. It may be created by researchers who liberally interpret scarce sources. 

Pseudo-mythology should not be confused with the term "false mythology" in the derogatory meanings of "false beliefs" or "false/fabricated stories".

Philosopher Vincent Descombes maintains that "a myth is what is told as a myth and what is transmitted as a myth". Therefore, in his opinion, the correct term would be "poor mythology" or "insipid mythology", rather than "pseudo-mythology".

Slavic mythology
There is a scarcity of reliable sources for the Slavic religion.

A large number of questionable Slavic deities have been described since 16th century and until present days.

Polish chroniclers of the 16th and 17th centuries, invented many pseudo-deities based on models from the antiquity.

Belarus
Despite the fact that his writings were heavily criticized by the contemporaries (e.g., by Alexander Potebnja), it has been treated as a trusted reference work by several generations of researchers. While Shpilevsky did collect Belarusian folklore, he liberally added his own interpretations without drawing distinction from authentic folklore.

Germanic mythology
Several pseudo deities come from the research of Jacob Grimm presented in his 1835 treatise Deutsche Mythologie. It was the first comprehensive study of German mythology. Later his methods in the study of mythology were criticized. While modern researchers were able to prove that goddesses such as Zisa, Rheda/Hruoda, or Ostara cannot be historically attested, some of them repeatedly appear as genuine deities, especially in non-scientific or popular science media.

Baltic states

Lithuania
Jan Łasicki in his Concerning the gods of Samagitians, and other Sarmatians and false Christians (De diis Samagitarum caeterorumque Sarmatarum et falsorum Christianorum, written  and published in 1615) provides a a list of 78 deities and spirits.

Latvia
After the abolition of serfdom in Latvia, a new national identity was forming and authors sought to prove that Baltic cultural traditions were as deep as those of other nations. It was hoped that a grand epic could be constructed using pieces preserved in folklore. It was also thought that the ancient religion, forgotten during 700 years of oppression, could be reconstructed. However, folklore sources proved insufficient for the task.   Some attempted to reconstruct pantheons to be as impressive as in Greek mythology, which led to some deities being simply invented. Besides the assumption that deities of other Baltic peoples must be Latvian as well but were simply lost over time, many new deities were modeled after Greek and Roman deities. An example of the trend is the epic poem Lāčplēsis by Andrejs Pumpurs, which features a pantheon of Latvian and Prussian gods and some the author has invented himself. Similarly, works of Juris Alunāns and poet Miķelis Krogzemis feature pantheons of invented deities.

Estonia
 writes that the Estonian pantheon started shaping in the 19th century during the period of national awakening. The older sources about ancient Estonian deities are scarce and ambiguous, while the 19th-century research was uncritical. Still, 19th century writings shaped the modern interpretation of Estonian mythology. Therefore, Põldvee writes that the term "pseudo-mythology" is applicable here. In particular, it is traceable how the Estonian god Vanemuine was reconstructed by Estonian intellectuals from Finnish Väinämöinen, whose authenticity (at least the whole mythology around him) has also been questioned.

See also
Fakelore
Demogorgon
Mythopoeia

References

Further reading
Зубов Н.И. Научные фантомы славянского Олимпа (Scientific Fantoms of Slavic Olympus), Живая старина. 1995. No. 3. С. 46–48;
Топорков А. Л. Теория мифа в русской филологической науке XIX века. М., 1997.
Nikolai Mikhailov, Traktat o slovanskih bogovih iz XVII. stol.: M. Fren(t)zel, Dissertationes historicae tres de idolis Slavorum, Studia Mythologica Slavica 4, 2001, pp. 17–24Author's summary: "The paper examines a mythological tractate of the Lusatian researcher Michael Frenzel (Fren{t}zel) on Slavic deities from the 17th century. The tractate (“three dissertations”), which contains an eclectic description of the Slavic and the Lusatian pantheons, is a typical case of the so-called “cabinet mythology”. This kind of literature, nevertheless, also needs to be analyzed: in part as a monument to scientific thought, partly (although with a large dose of caution) as a secondary source for the reconstruction of local - in this case Lusatian - mythological tradition.} 
H. J. Rose, Mythology and Pseudo-mythology: Presidential Address'', 1935, 

Mythology
Pseudoscience